Phintella parva is a species of jumping spider in the genus Phintella that lives in China, Japan, Korea and Russia. The species was first described by Wanda Wesołowska in 1981 based on a holotype from North Korea. However, retrospectively; it was recognised that other examples of the spider had been previously collected and, at one time, a description published without a species name. The abdomen has a striped pattern and the carapace has circular markings, but the most distinguishing difference between this species and other members of the genus are the sexual organs, particularly the short curved embolus on the male and long straight insemination ducts in the female.

Taxonomy
In 1981, Wanda Wesołowska described a new species of jumping spider, which she named Icius parvus, one of over 500 species identified by the Polish arachnologist over her career. The species name is the Latin for small. The species was originally ascribed to the genus Icius. first described by Eugène Simon in 1876, but was transferred to Phintella in 1983 by Jerzy Prószyński. The genus Phintella was raised in 1906 by Embrik Strand and W. Bösenberg. The genus name derives from the genus Phintia, which it resembles. The genus Phintia was itself renamed Phintodes, which was subsequently absorbed into Tylogonus. There are similarities between spiders within genus Phintella and those in Chira, Chrysilla, Euophrys, Icius, Jotus and Telamonia. Genetic analysis confirms that it is related to the genera Helvetia and Menemerus and is classified in the tribe Chrysillini. After being transferred to the new genus, the gender of the species name was changed, from parvus to parva.

Description
It is typical of the genus, closely resembling the related Phintella popovi, but differing in the shape of the sexual organs. The spider has a yellow carapace with circular markings to towards the back. The area around the mouth is similarly yellow, as are the spinnerets, legs and the abdomen, which also has two broad stripes running down it and along the sides.

The male has a short curved embolus and straight appendages that form part of the pedipalp, while the female has a pocket in the epigyne and long straight insemination ducts. The curved embolus and length of the ducts are particularly characteristic of the species.

Distribution and habitat
The holotype for the species was discovered in the valleys around Mount Myohyang, North Korea by Bohdan Pisarski and Jerzy Prószyński in 1959. Female specimens were also seen near to the city of Pyongyang and in the South Hamgyong Province. Wesołowska also identified that it had been found in Primorsky Krai, in what is now Russia, and described in 1979, but had not been given a species name. It was later seen that the spider was also to be found on Furugelm Island.

The first example in China was identified in Shanxi. The species was subsequently found in many other areas of the country, including Beijing, Gansu, Hebei and Henan. South Korea was also added to the species distribution, with examples being identified in Sobaeksan and area around Palgongsan in the North Gyeongsang Province, the first dating from 1964. The spider has also been observed in the Mie Prefecture of Honshu, Japan, which extended its range still further.

The spider seems to thrive in diverse environments, including the environs of Tianchi Mountain, Song County, Luoyang, the city of Linzhou, rural areas in Neixiang County and pine woods of Khabarovsk Krai.

References

Citations

Bibliography

Arthropods of Korea
Chelicerates of Japan
Salticidae
Spiders described in 1981
Spiders of Asia
Spiders of China
Taxa named by Wanda Wesołowska